Illinois Valley Central Unit District 321 is the school district in the northeast corner of Peoria County, Illinois, including the communities of Chillicothe, Mossville, and Rome, Illinois.

Schools
 Illinois Valley Central High School, Chillicothe: usually referred to as "IVC" or occasionally still as "Chillicothe"
 Chillicothe Elementary Center (CEC), Chillicothe: approximately 495 students
 Mossville School, Mossville: approximately 800 students
 South Elementary School, Chillicothe: approximately 285 students

External links
 IVC District #321 — official website

Education in Peoria County, Illinois
School districts in Illinois